Scotch Corners Wetland is a provincially significant wetland complex located in Lanark County, Ontario, Canada. The  area has a wide array of wetland types including swamps, marshes, vernal pools, beaver ponds and seepage areas.  It forms the headwaters of several creeks that drain into Mississippi Lake.

Description
The northern portions of the wetland are interspersed with forested gneiss ridges, while the southern and eastern portions are flat and underlain by clay sediments deposited by the post-glacial Champlain Sea. The old shoreline of the Champlain Sea meanders from Blue Heron Road in the north-east to Innisville in the south-west. Along this elevation, the clay deposits of the Champlain Sea abut exposed gneiss. A series of seepage areas, springs and small streams are scattered along this contact line.

Noteworthy breeding birds include osprey, great blue herons and turkey vultures. The larger ponds provide migratory resting areas for ducks, particularly wood ducks, hooded mergansers and ring-necked ducks.  There are healthy populations of at least eight species of frogs: wood frogs, leopard frogs, spring peepers, American toads, gray treefrogs, mink frogs, green frogs and bullfrogs.  There are also three species of salamanders: spotted, blue-spotted and red-backed. Three species of turtles are known from the wetland: painted turtles, snapping turtles and Blanding's turtles. Wetland mammals include otters, muskrats, beavers and ermine.

There is a typical wetland flora. Some significant plant species include a population of green arrow arum growing at the extreme northern limit of its range in North America, and a population of an uncommon orchid, downy rattlesnake plantain.

Only  of the wetland and another  of adjoining forest is protected by the Mississippi Madawaska Land Trust as the Keddy Nature Sanctuary.

References

Wetlands of Ontario
Protected areas of Lanark County